Sir Alexander Bannerman (7 October 1788 – 30 December 1864) was a Scottish merchant, vintner, politician and British colonial governor.

Early life
Known as "Sandy", he was born on 7 October 1788 in Scotland. He was the eldest son of merchant Thomas Bannerman (1743–1820) and his wife, Jean (née Simson) Bannerman (1745–1817), who married in 1779. His younger brother, Thomas, was the father of Sir George Bannerman, 10th Baronet and grandfather of Sir Alexander Bannerman, 11th Baronet.

His maternal grandfather was George Simson of Hazlehead. His paternal grandparents were Aberdeen merchant Alexander Bannerman and Margaret (née Burnett) Bannerman. His uncle was Sir Alexander Bannerman, 6th Baronet.

Bannerman was a prominent businessman in his hometown of Aberdeen managing the family wine business as well as having a hand in trading and whaling. Bannerman served as the city's provost and in 1837, was elected dean of Marischal College, Aberdeen.

Career
Alexander Bannerman joined the town council of Aberdeen in 1811.  He was a reformer, challenging the long-standing oligarchy led by James and Gavin Hadden, and was instrumental in establishing an elected trust to manage the new Aberdeen Harbour.

In 1832 he became Member of Parliament (MP) for Aberdeen in the British House of Commons, sitting as a Radical, and remained an MP until his retirement in 1847. Together with his wife, Margaret Gordon the granddaughter of former Governor Walter Patterson, Bannerman returned to the colony of her birth, when he took up the appointment in 1851 as governor of Prince Edward Island. On this occasion he was made a Knight Bachelor. Bannerman instituted responsible government on the island but was removed in 1854 due to political unrest in which he favoured the Reformers. Subsequently, he was governor of the Bahamas until 1857, when he returned north to become governor of Newfoundland, the second governor since responsible government had been granted.

He clashed with John Kent, the premier of Newfoundland, who he felt was corrupt. Bannerman accused Kent's government, as did Bishop Mullock, of using relief aid as patronage and also accused Kent of being unreasonable in negotiations with France over the French Shore. In 1861, after Kent had accused Bannerman of conspiring with the courts and opposition Conservative Party of Newfoundland against a proposal to reduce the salaries of judges, Bannerman dismissed the Kent government and appointed the leader of the opposition, Hugh Hoyles as the new Premier.

Kent's Liberal Party of Newfoundland defeated the Conservative government in a Motion of No Confidence resulting in an election campaign that was fought along sectarian lines with Catholics largely voting Liberal and Protestants largely voting Conservative. The Protestant Conservative Party of Newfoundland narrowly defeated Kent's Liberals. Extensive rioting led to disputed results, with the Conservatives having a majority of only two until in a peaceful by-election Harbour Grace returned two Conservatives.
 
Bannerman' initial action in dismissing Kent had been rash and the Colonial Office told him so, but Hoyles, the new Premier, moved towards non-sectarian government, both bishops called for order, and the politics of class replaced the politics of religion. Bannerman resigned as governor in 1864 and returned to England.

Personal life
In 1825, Bannerman married Margaret Gordon, a daughter of Guthrie Gordon, Esq. Lady Bannerman, as she was known, was born in Charlottetown on Prince Edward Island, and was a granddaughter of Walter Patterson who had been the Island's first governor. She was later identified as "Carlyle's first love" by her biographer, who tells of the young schoolmaster Thomas Carlyle, in Kirkcaldy, Scotland, "who was attracted by her intelligence and wit." Her family considered Carlyle as an unsuitable marriage prospect, and she eventually married Bannerman, a distant cousin.

While in England, he caught a cold and, in his enfeebled state, fell down a flight of stairs causing his death on 30 December 1864 in Mayfair, London aged 76.

Legacy
Bannerman Park in St. John's commemorates his name in Newfoundland.

References

External links 
 
 
Biography at Government House The Governorship of Newfoundland and Labrador
Biography at the Dictionary of Canadian Biography Online

1788 births
1864 deaths
British governors of the Bahamas
Knights Bachelor
Members of the Parliament of the United Kingdom for Aberdeen constituencies
Members of the Parliament of the United Kingdom for Scottish constituencies
Governors of Newfoundland Colony
People from Aberdeen
19th-century Scottish businesspeople
UK MPs 1832–1835
UK MPs 1835–1837
UK MPs 1837–1841
UK MPs 1841–1847
Wine merchants
Lieutenant Governors of the Colony of Prince Edward Island
Rectors of the University of Aberdeen